The following is a list of colleges and universities in the U.S. state of North Carolina.

Four-year colleges and universities in North Carolina

Defunct institutions

North Carolina Community College System

Two-year institutions 
Alamance Community College
Asheville–Buncombe Technical Community College
Beaufort County Community College
Bladen Community College
Blue Ridge Community College
Brunswick Community College
Caldwell Community College & Technical Institute
Cape Fear Community College
Carteret Community College
Catawba Valley Community College
Central Carolina Community College
Central Piedmont Community College
Cleveland Community College
College of the Albemarle
Coastal Carolina Community College
Craven Community College
Davidson County Community College
Durham Technical Community College
Edgecombe Community College
Fayetteville Technical Community College
Forsyth Technical Community College
Gaston College
Guilford Technical Community College
Halifax Community College
Haywood Community College
Isothermal Community College
James Sprunt Community College
Johnston Community College
Lenoir Community College
Louisburg College
Martin Community College
Mayland Community College
McDowell Technical Community College
Mitchell Community College
Montgomery Community College
Nash Community College
Pamlico Community College
Piedmont Community College
Pitt Community College
Randolph Community College
Richmond Community College
Roanoke–Chowan Community College
Robeson Community College
Rockingham Community College
Rowan–Cabarrus Community College
Sandhills Community College
Sampson Community College
South Piedmont Community College
Southeastern Community College
Southwestern Community College
Stanly Community College
Surry Community College
Tri-County Community College
Vance–Granville Community College
Wake Technical Community College
Wayne Community College
Western Piedmont Community College
Wilkes Community College
Wilson Community College

See also

North Carolina
List of universities in North Carolina by enrollment
 Higher education in the United States
 List of college athletic programs in North Carolina
 List of American institutions of higher education
 List of recognized higher education accreditation organizations
List of colleges and universities
List of colleges and universities by country
List of community colleges

References

External links
Department of Education listing of accredited institutions in North Carolina
North Carolina Community College System
North Carolina Independent Colleges & Universities

North Carolina
Universities and colleges